Saki Hattori (born 22 December 1996) is a Japanese female handball player for Sony Semiconductor and the Japanese national team.

She represented Japan at the 2021 World Women's Handball Championship in Spain.

References

1996 births
Living people
Japanese female handball players
21st-century Japanese women
20th-century Japanese women